= Deepdi =

- village
- Location within Madhya Pradesh Location within India
- Coordinates: 23.130908°N 77.513716°E
- Country: India
- State: Madhya Pradesh
- District: Bhopal
- Tehsil: Huzur

Population (2011)
  - Total: 1,327
- Time zone: UTC+5:30 (IST)
- ISO 3166 code: MP-IN
- Census code: 482557

Deepdi is a village in the Bhopal district of Madhya Pradesh, India. It is located in the Huzur tehsil and the Phanda block.

== Demographics ==
According to the 2011 census of India, Deepdi has 229 households. The effective literacy rate (i.e. the literacy rate of population excluding children aged 6 and below) is 66.58%.

Demographics (2011 Census)
| | Total | Male | Female |
|---|---|---|---|
| Population | 1327 | 685 | 642 |
| Children aged below 6 years | 193 | 99 | 94 |
| Scheduled caste | 462 | 247 | 215 |
| Scheduled tribe | 163 | 84 | 79 |
| Literates | 755 | 439 | 316 |
| Workers (all) | 416 | 351 | 65 |
| Main workers (total) | 415 | 350 | 65 |
| Main workers: Cultivators | 121 | 114 | 7 |
| Main workers: Agricultural labourers | 157 | 117 | 40 |
| Main workers: Household industry workers | 0 | 0 | 0 |
| Main workers: Other | 137 | 119 | 18 |
| Marginal workers (total) | 1 | 1 | 0 |
| Marginal workers: Cultivators | 1 | 1 | 0 |
| Marginal workers: Agricultural labourers | 0 | 0 | 0 |
| Marginal workers: Household industry workers | 0 | 0 | 0 |
| Marginal workers: Others | 0 | 0 | 0 |
| Non-workers | 911 | 334 | 577 |
